Alexander Hetherwick CBE (1860–1939) was a Scottish minister remembered as a missionary in Africa. Based  in Blantyre, Nyasaland he wrote extensively on local languages and also was a competent map-maker. W. P. Livingstone described him as a "Prince of Missionaries".

Life

He was born in Savoch in Aberdeenshire on 12 April 1860. He originally studied Mathematics at Aberdeen University but after graduation (around 1880) decided to train for the ministry, despite having the highest marks in Mathematics

He was ordained by the Church of Scotland in the Kirk of St Nicholas in Aberdeen in 1883. He requested transfer to do missionary work in Africa in 1885 and moved to the mission in Blantyre in what is now known as Malawi. He was charged with working with the then hostile tribes of the Zomba plateau. In 1898 he succeeded Rev D C Scott as head of the Blantyre mission.

He was a speaker at the International Mission Conference in London 1888. 

In 1915 he was involved in the enquiry into the John Chilembwe Rebellion. In conjunction with Robert Laws he founded the Church of Central Africa Presbytery in 1924.

He retired in 1928 and returned to Aberdeen.

He died in Aberdeen on 3 April 1939.

Memorials

A brass plaque to Hetherwick was placed in the Kirk of St Nicholas in the 1940s.

Publications
Introductory Handbook of the Yao Language (1889)
Dictionary of the Chichewa Language
Robert Hellier Napier (1926)
The Romance of Blantyre (1931)
A Practical Manual of the Nyanja Language (1920 reprinted 1932)
The Gospel and the African (1932)

Maps created

Lake Shirwa and Neighbourhood (1888)

References

1860 births
1939 deaths
People from Aberdeenshire
Alumni of the University of Aberdeen
Scottish Presbyterian missionaries
Presbyterian missionaries in Malawi